The 2011 French Figure Skating Championships took place between 17 and 19 December 2010 at the Patinoire de Tours in Tours. Skaters competed in the disciplines of men's singles, ladies' singles, pair skating, ice dancing, and synchronized skating on the senior level. The results were among the criteria used to choose the French entries for the 2011 World Championships and the 2011 European Championships.

Results

Men

Ladies

Pairs

Ice dancing

Synchronized

Junior results
The Junior Championships took place from April 1–3, 2011 at the Patinoire de Cergy-Pontoise in Cergy.

Men

Ladies

Pairs

Synchronized

External links
 2011 French Championships results
 2011 French Junior Championships results

2011
2011 in figure skating
2010 in figure skating
2011 in French sport